Niall McNamee (born 21 October 1985 in Rhode, County Offaly) is an Irish sportsperson.  He plays Gaelic football with his local club Rhode and the Offaly county team. 

He has been one of the top forwards in the country from the mid-2000s. He has had little success with Offaly but did play in the 2006 Leinster final but lost out to Dublin. 

He was a member of the Irish team for the 2010 International Rules Series.

He has had much success at club level with both his with his local club Rhode and with UCD. With Rhode he has won Offaly Senior Football Championships in 2004, 2005, 2006, 2008, 2010 2012 2014, 2016 and 2017. In 2016 also Niall Mcnamee won Senior footballer of the year. He also won Minor and Under 21 titles with the club. With UCD he won a Dublin Senior Football Championship in 2006.

Having first played for Offaly at the age of 17 on 25 May 2003, McNamee played for the hundredth time in the 2021 National Football League when he made a substitute appearance against Tipperary. His league and championship appearances at that time amounted to 148.

As of the conclusion of the 2022 season, McNamee was the joint longest serving inter-county player (alongside Ross Munnelly of Laois).

References

 http://hoganstand.com/offaly/ArticleForm.aspx?ID=63241
 http://hoganstand.com/offaly/ArticleForm.aspx?ID=69441
 http://hoganstand.com/offaly/ArticleForm.aspx?ID=69023

Year of birth uncertain
1985 births
Living people
Alumni of University College Dublin
Gaelic football forwards
Irish international rules football players
Offaly inter-county Gaelic footballers
Rhode Gaelic footballers
UCD Gaelic footballers
People from Tullamore, County Offaly